Southern/Central Avenue is an under-construction light rail station on the Valley Metro system in Phoenix. Built as part of the South Central Extension, it located on Central Avenue at Roeser Road. The station is expected to open in 2024.

References

Valley Metro Rail stations in Phoenix, Arizona
Railway stations scheduled to open in 2024
Railway stations under construction in the United States
Future Valley Metro Rail stations